Niterói is a municipality of the state of Rio de Janeiro in the southeast region of Brazil. It lies across Guanabara Bay facing the city of Rio de Janeiro and forms part of the Rio de Janeiro Metropolitan Area. It was the state capital, as marked by its golden mural crown, from 1834 to 1894 and again from 1903 to 1975. It has the highest Human Development Index of the state and the seventh highest among Brazil's municipalities in 2010. Individually, it is the second municipality with the highest average monthly household income per capita in Brazil and appears in 13th place among the municipalities of the country according to social indicators related to education. The city has the nicknames of Nikiti, Nicki City and the Smile City (Cidade Sorriso).

Studies by the Getulio Vargas Foundation in June 2011 classified Niterói as the richest city of Brazil, with 55.7% of the population included in class A. Considering the classes A and B, Niterói also appears in the first place, with 85.9% of the population in these classes. According to data from the 2010 IBGE, Niterói's nominal gross domestic product was 11.2 billion reais, being the fifth municipality with the highest gross domestic product of the state. The city is the second largest formal employer in the State of Rio de Janeiro, although it occupies the 5th place in terms of the number of inhabitants. The city is one of the main financial, commercial and industrial centers of the State of Rio de Janeiro, being the 12th among the 100 best Brazilian cities to do business.

Niterói was founded on 22 November 1573 by the Tupi Amerindian chief Araribóia, who later was forcibly converted to Roman Catholicism and given the Christian name of Martim Afonso, after the Portuguese explorer Martim Afonso de Sousa, making it the only Brazilian city to have been founded by a non-Christian, non-assimilated Brazilian Amerindian.

The municipality contains part of the  Serra da Tiririca State Park, created in 1991.

Toponym
The word "Niterói" comes from Tupi and means "water that hides". Originally spelled Nictheroy or "Nitheroy"), it was the indigenous name of the port of the city of Rio de Janeiro around 1554. In 1834, the old indigenous toponym "Niterói" was adopted, until then called "Vila Real da Praia Grande", when it became the capital of the province of Rio de Janeiro. There are several explanations for the meaning of the term in Tupi: 
 "winding port".

History

France Antarctique

In the year 1555, French navigator Nicolas Durand de Villegaignon allied himself with the Tupinambas Indians who dominated the Guanabara Bay and instituted a French colony in the region, France Antarctique. The region was avoided by the Portuguese because of the hostility of the Tupinamba. The region developed under the command of Villegaignon, who planned to build a city in the region. After a while, Calvinists who had immigrated from France to the colony returned to France, where they accused Villegaignon of prejudice against Protestants and of maladministration. The French navigator had to return to France to explain himself.

Following the absence of the French leader, the Portuguese crown began noticing that the bay of Rio de Janeiro would make a strategic scale for the Atlantic route of ships from Portugal to its colonies in Africa and Asia, as well an important advanced bridgehead for the defense of South Brazil. Fortresses were built and an alliance was formed with nearby native Tupi-Guaraní tribes to defend the settlement against other European invaders. Then, in 1560, the Portuguese leader Mem de Sá attacked and destroyed the French fort that was located in Guanabara Bay, Coligny Fort, without, however, being able to definitively expel the French from the region. Estácio de Sá, Mem de Sá's nephew, who would continue to command the war, enlisted the help of the head of the Temiminos Indians, Araribóia, who accepted the governor's request to help the Portuguese expel the French from the Guanabara Bay, in the hope to regain the mother island.

With the end of the war in 1567, Estácio de Sá invoked Arariboia and the Temininós Indians to occupy the right side of the entrance to the Guanabara Bay, opposite the city of São Sebastião do Rio de Janeiro founded by Estácio in 1565, as previously requested by Araribóia a tract of land. Thus, the entrance to the bay would be fully protected from intrusion. The place to be occupied by Arariboia was known as "Banda D'Além" (the land beyond), in the eastern side of the bay, from River Marui to the Red Barriers between Gragoata and Boa Viagem beaches. This area corresponded to what is nowadays the northwestern part of the municipality of Niterói, which includes the central and northern zones of its urban area. There, in the "Land Beyond", Araribóia founded the Town of Saint Lawrence of the Indians (in Portuguese, Vila de São Lourenço dos Índios), the embryo for the future city of Niterói, a Tupi name that means "Hidden Waters".

Imperial era
The village was visited by the King of Brazil, John VI, in 1816, who also decreed its emancipation from Rio de Janeiro on 10 May 1819 and gave the new-created municipality a new name, Vila Real da Praia Grande (Royal Town of Great Beach).

In 1834, the city of Rio de Janeiro, capital of the newly established Empire of Brazil, was detached from the rest of Rio de Janeiro Province; Vila Real da Praia Grande was then chosen as the new capital of that province, while the city of Rio de Janeiro itself was converted into a neutral municipality, following the Ato Adicional. Niterói served the function of capital until the year of 1975 – except for the period between 1894 and 1903 when it was temporarily transferred to the city of Petrópolis.

Vila Real da Praia Grande was officially renamed Nictheroy (Tupi for "hidden waters") on 6 March 1835. This old spelling persisted until the mid-20th century, when the current spelling–Niterói–was adopted. The capital condition has brought a number of urban developments such as the steam boat, public lighting to whale oil, water supply and new means of transport to connect the city to the interior of the province. Nine years later, the Emperor Pedro II granted the city of Niterói the title of Imperial City. The appointment was given to the most important cities, giving them some autonomy and regional power.

At the end of the 19th century, around 1885, some tram systems were founded, which allowed the expansion of the city to Icaraí, Ponta d'Areia and Itaipu districts.

Republican era

In 1890, the Brazilian provinces began being called states and the neutral municipality (Rio de Janeiro city) had its status changed to Federal District (or simply DF, the Brazilian acronym for Distrito Federal).

The monarchist navy revolt in 1893 damaged productive activities and forced the transfer of the capital's headquarters to Petrópolis. In 1903, Niterói returned to be the capital of the state of Rio de Janeiro. This brought about a new impulse to modernize the city with the construction of squares, decks, parks, waterway station and sewage network, as well as widening of the streets and main avenues.

A circus fire in the city killed 323 people on 17 December 1961; the fire was later found to have been deliberately set by disgruntled circus employees. It is one of the worst tragedies in Brazilian history and the most fatal in the annals of world circus show history.

Following the transference of Brazil's capital to Brasília in 1960, the city of Rio de Janeiro became a city-state named Guanabara. This state was merged with Rio de Janeiro State in 1975; since then, Niterói lost its condition of the state's capital in favor of the city of Rio de Janeiro.

On 8 April 2010; the mudslide triggered due to heavy rainfall cost at least 200 lives. At least 11,000 people were forced to flee homes due to further mudslides.

Geography
Niterói has an area of 129,375 square kilometers located between the Guanabara Bay (west), the Atlantic Ocean (south), Maricá (east) and São Gonçalo (north).

There are a number of beaches in the area, including Praia de Fora and Praia do Imbuí, with their historical values; Piratininga Beach, Camboinhas Beach, Itaipu Beach and Itacoatiara Beach, the most visited; Praia do Sossego, Praia Adam and Eve and Prainha. It has two saltwater lagoons: Piratininga and Itaipu. The first is linked to the second by means of the Camboatá Canal, opened by the National Department of Sanitation Works in 1946. The Itaipu Lagoon, in turn, connects to the sea through the Itaipu Canal, which was built in 1979

The relief consists of crystalline terrains, divided into massifs and coastal hills. The massifs predominate in the south and form the mountains of Malheiro, Calaboca and Tiririca, where is the Stone of the Elephant, the highest point of the municipality, 412m high.

The coastal plains are composed of sediments, obviously located near the sea. The most extensive area covers the entire area of Piratininga and Itaipu lagoons.

Climate
Niterói has a tropical climate, specifically a tropical monsoon climate, with warm to hot temperatures year round as well as relatively frequent rainfall.

Politics

In Niterói, executive power is represented by the mayor and cabinet of secretaries, in accordance with the model proposed by the Federal Constitution. The Organic Law of the Municipality and the current Master Plan, however, prescribe that the public administration should give the population effective tools to exercise participatory democracy. Thus, the city is divided into regional secretariats (although it has already been divided into regional administrations), each headed by a secretary appointed by the mayor.

The legislative power is constituted to the Municipality of Niterói (CMN), composed of 21 elected councilors for mandates of four years (in compliance with the provisions of Article 29 of the Federal Constitution, which governs a minimum and maximum number for municipalities according to with number of inhabitants). It is up to the house to draft and vote fundamental laws to the administration and to the Executive, especially the participative budget (Budgetary Guidelines Law).

The current mayor of Niterói is Axel Grael of the Democratic Labour Party, who was elected in 2020 amidst the ongoing coronavirus pandemic in Brazil; he was ex-mayor Rodrigo Neves's deputy for the 2012–2016 term and Secretary of Planning during the 2017–2020 term.

Economy

Niteroi is one most important financial and commercial centers in Rio de Janeiro State, like a modern city, with modern buildings and several shopping malls. Its economy is centered on its trading and commerce services, like real-estate corporations, graphic design, web design and publicity.
It also hosts industries of food (especially seafood), clothes, candles, and marine objects.

The city is located 25 minutes away from Rio de Janeiro's downtown region. Niterói boasts the title of fourth richest city in the state, and the third in Rio de Janeiro City Metropolitan Area.
The Niterói Contemporary Art Museum, the city's main landmark, was designed by the famous Brazilian modernist architect Oscar Niemeyer. The landscape of the central urban area of the city is dominated by the Niterói Tower, a tall cylindrical office building belonging to the Niterói Shopping Mall.

Growth
By the time of its emancipation, the urban area of Niteroi corresponded to its central zone and São Domingos only. The south zone – Icarai, Santa Rosa, Vital Brazil – began to be urbanized in 1841, when the Santa Rosa farm was divided into estates, while Jurujuba evolved from an old fishermen colony. São Francisco and Charitas, sites named after the Catholic Church built in honor to Saint Francis by the Jurujuba cove, remained sparsely populated until about 1940. As for the northern zone of Niteroi, its urbanization began in the late 19th century, when a tramway was inaugurated, allowing the expansion of the city to north and northeast, as well boosting the urban growth of the neighbouring municipality of São Gonçalo.

The realm of Itaipu – a former vast zone of farming lands and forests east of Niteroi – was annexed to the municipality in 1943. It has lost its countryside traits and its urban population has grown fast since the late 1960s.

In the early 20th century, Niteroi started its industrialization boom.

Demographics
Niteroi is  distant from Rio de Janeiro City, to which it is linked by the Rio-Niterói bridge and two ferry-boat services. According to the 2010 Brazilian Census, the city has a population of 487,320 people, making it the fifth most populous city in the state of Rio de Janeiro and the 39th most populous in the country. At the 2010 Census, the population of Niterói grew 9.3% from 2000 to 2010, meaning Niterói had the lowest city population growth in the state of Rio de Janeiro in this period.

The quality of life of the municipality of Niteroi is considered one of the best (third place) among 5,600 other Brazilian municipalities, according to UN indexes (2000 est.).

The population in Niteroi in 2010 was 487,327, down from the 698,582 in 1950, but with an increase compared to 2000, of 9%. According to the Census in 2010, whites were 73.6%, multiracial 19.1%, black 4%. Non-Brazilians of any race were 1% of population, down from the 36% in 1950. Niterói is a town with a high quality of life and a centre of agglomerate made up by rich families. In 2010, "Class A" people were 32% (the highest index in Brazil, while 14.8% were in the poverty line, less than cities like Detroit, Miami, Cleveland and Philadelphia. Homes in the "Ghetto type" were 27% (Favelas 6%), less than Rio de Janeiro (37.5% "Ghetto type" with 11% made up Favelas).

Religion

In the city of Niterói there are several manifest religious doctrines. According to the 2010 census, of the total population of Niterói, there were 258,391 Roman Catholic (53%), 97,759 evangelicals (35%) and 34,484 Spiritists (11%).

According to the division of the Catholic Church in Brazil, Niterói belongs to the Regional Episcopal Council East I of the National Conference of Bishops of Brazil, and the archiepiscopal seat is in the city of Niterói. The Archdiocese of Niterói comprises 14 municipalities of the region of the capital and the interior of the State of Rio de Janeiro, forming in total 73 parishes and 1 quasi-parish divided into 6 vicariates. There is also the Jewish community integrated to the Israeli Federation of Rio de Janeiro, it also has the most different Protestant creeds, as well as the practice of Buddhism, messianism, Afro-Brazilian religions and others.

Education
Niteroi is the seat of the Fluminense Federal University, one of the most important research centers in Brazil. It does have other colleges such as ISE La Salle and Cândido Mendes University.

Catholic schools, mainly La Salle Institute and São Vicente de Paulo, are the most traditional elementary and high schools of the city. Other important schools are PH, Marília Matoso, Pedro II, Gay Lussac, Instituto Abel, Colégio Nossa Senhora Das Mercês, the Salesian High School, ETE – Henrique Lage (a.k.a. Faetec), Oswaldo Cruz Institute and Escola Canadense de Niterói.

Niterói has the highest Human Development Index (HDI) and best level of literacy in the State of Rio de Janeiro.

Transportation

Bus
The urban bus service is the only means of public transportation in the city of Niterói. There are just under fifty active lines, all operated by private companies. Most municipal bus lines have an end point in the center of Niterói (at the João Goulart Bus Terminal), or they pass through the center of Niterói.

Ferry

The sea crossing between Niterói and the city of Rio de Janeiro is made by two routes, both having as destination the Praça XV Station. The stations, in Niterói, are located in Araribóia Square, in the center and in the Charitas neighborhood. The crossing between Praça Araribóia and Praça 15 de Novembro is done by large boats, with capacity for up to 2,000 passengers, in a journey that lasts about twenty minutes.

Since 2006, the boats have been gradually replaced by large catamarans with a lower capacity (up to 1,200 passengers), but with a shorter crossing time of between 12 and 15 minutes. The crossing between the station of Charitas and that of the Praça 15 de Novembro× is done by small catamarans, being this service considered selective transport.

Train
There was a railway extension for passenger transportation, 33 km long, connecting Niterói to the municipality of Itaboraí, passing through São Gonçalo. Until its deactivation in 2007 the extension was operated by the state-owned company Central. In the end, there were only two daily trips, one in each direction, using an obsolete train of the 1950s. The line is now deactivated and in several sections, the tracks have been removed by the municipalities of São Gonçalo and Niterói. Since in the future there is the proposal to use the bed of this branch for the implementation of part of the projected Line 3 of the Rio Metro between Niterói and Itaboraí.

Culture

Niterói is one of the largest historical and cultural centers in Brazil. Its culture is characterized by fishing villages (Jurujuba), forts, museums and futuristic monuments, such as the Museum of Contemporary Art, the symbol of the municipality, built by the modernist architect Oscar Niemeyer and the Popular Theater of Niterói. The social culture is based on a very hospitable population, which resulted in the nickname of Niterói: "city-smile".

The architecture of Niterói is characterized by a contrast between the past and the present. Historic buildings, such as the Niterói State Library, the Justice Palace, the Niterói Post Office Building, the Municipal Theater of Niterói, the Cantareira Station, the Ingá Palace, the Solar do Jambeiro and the Niterói City Hall stand side by side to the side with works of futuristic bond, like, for example, the Museum of Contemporary Art, Square Juscelino Kubitschek. the Popular Theater of Niterói and the rest of the Niemeyer Way. Also known to have the best scout group in Brazil, the 4th GEMAR-Gaviões do Mar.

The Catholic churches also express a lot of niteroiense culture. The São Lourenço dos Índios Church, the foundation of the municipality, the Church of São Sebastião de Itaipu, Nossa Senhora da Boa Viagem, the Church of Saint Peter the Fisherman, the Cathedral of Saint John the Baptist and the Basilica of Our Lady Help of Christians embellish the streets with their baroque, classic and colonial architectures.

Sports

Besides being hometown of stars like Leonardo, Edmundo and Gérson, the city is also homeland of the Canto do Rio Foot-Ball Club, which was founded in 1913 and was the only club outside the city of Rio de Janeiro to participate in the Rio de Janeiro Championship in the 1940s. The club also had its anthem composed by Lamartine Babo, composer of the anthems for every participant of the Rio de Janeiro Championship of 1941 due to a radio campaign. The city is not currently represented in the elite of national football.

Other football clubs in the city are the Fonseca Athletic Club, which recently announced its return to professional football and the Rio Cricket and Athletic Association, which participated in the first championship in Rio, reaching third place and having the championship set in its stadium. Rio Cricket also participated in (possibly) the first rivalry of Rio de Janeiro's football, with Paissandu Atlético Clube, a club in the city of Rio de Janeiro, which was founded by Rio Cricket founders and has a Rio de Janeiro Championship title.

The city also has the Caio Martins Stadium, which is located in the Santa Rosa neighborhood and has for years been the home of Canto do Rio and more recently Botafogo in the 2000s. In 2007, the stadium's gymnasium was the stage of the final of the Feminine Superleague of Volleyball, that finished with victory of the team of Rio de Janeiro. Nowadays, the stadium is used for training of Botafogo and in games scheduled by the FFERJ - Mostly, in championships of inferior divisions.

Administrative divisions
From 1943 to the late 1970s, the county of Niteroi comprised two districts only: the district of Niteroi (original area) and the district of Itaipu (acquired in 1943), which barely had an urban continuity or even proper road links to each other and were considered apart areas.  The fractioning of Itaipu's farms into real estates as well its boom after the building of the Rio-Niterói's bridge demanded a better integration between the two sides of the county which led to the improving of the roads and urban facilities and a reformation on the make up of Niteroi's administrative division.  The county was reorganised into five districts.  In the early 1990s, the administrative division of Niterói was altered once again, being the county now divided into twelve administrative, further subdivided into 52 bairros (neighborhoods) and 5 Regiões de Planejamento ("Planning Regions"):

Notable people

Alex Rodrigo Dias da Costa – footballer
André Marques  – TV show host, entertainer
Arthur Maia  –  musician (bass player)
Bruno Beltrão – choreographer
Baby Consuelo – singer
Benjamin Constant – politician
Bonde Das Maravilhas – funk carioca dancers
Daniel Lins Cortês – footballer
Edmundo – footballer
Fernanda Keller – triathlete, iron-man winner
Gérson – footballer
Jô Bilac – Playwright

Leonardo – Former Director of Football for Paris Saint-Germain F.C.
Leila Diniz – actress
Marcello Antony – actor
Marcelo Ferreira – athlete (sailing), Olympic medallist
Marcia Haydée – Ballerina, choreographer and ballet director
Matheus Fernandes – footballer
Murilo Benício – actor
Patricia Acioli – judge
Perla Haney-Jardine – actress
Paulo Gustavo – actor and comedian
Rafael dos Anjos – Mixed martial artist, former UFC lightweight champion
Raica Oliveira – model
Ricardo Arona – fighter
Sérgio Mendes – musician, songwriter
Sérgio Pereira da Silva Porto – physicist
Sheymon Moraes – Mixed martial artist
Torben Grael, Lars Grael and Martine Grael – athletes (sailing), Olympic medallists

Gallery

References

External links

History of the city of Niterói
Niterói Tourism Official Web Site
A guide to the city of Niterói
Satellite picture by Google Maps
Niterói on WikiMapia
Gymnastic formation squadron of Niteroi, Nov. 2009
Amo Niterói
Parque da Cidade – Paragliding take off ramp.

 
Municipalities in Rio de Janeiro (state)
Guanabara Bay
Populated coastal places in Rio de Janeiro (state)
Populated places established in 1573
1573 establishments in Brazil
1573 establishments in the Portuguese Empire